The Xuxa Park fire was a flash fire that erupted on a Brazilian TV soundstage in Rio de Janeiro during a 2001 taping of the children's television show Xuxa Park. There were no casualties. The incident was captured on videotape.

The fire 
On 11 January 2001, a taping of Xuxa Park was in progress on a soundstage of the Brazilian network Rede Globo with a live audience of about 300 people (most of whom were children) in attendance. As Xuxa and her dancers were performing a show-closing musical number, a small fire started in the set's mechanical "spaceship" (through which Xuxa would normally have exited the stage in another 2 minutes). For a few seconds, they continued their musical number, unaware of what was happening behind them. An alert stagehand quickly appeared with a small fire extinguisher and attempted to extinguish the flames, but suddenly the fire erupted violently, engulfing the "spaceship," and he was forced to retreat as others on stage also began to flee. The fire grew and spread quickly and intensively as children, dancers, stagehands, and audience members fled towards the exits to escape the heat, smoke, and melting plastic. Within less than a minute, the entire set was engulfed in flames. Children were removed from the ferris wheel, which was a part of the scenery. The only one who failed to get out was Thamires. Leonilson, Xuxa's bodyguard, came back to remove her.

Though camera operators and other technicians fled with the others, the cameras continued to operate and feed the videotape machines as the conflagration grew before the cameras were pulled out of the burning soundstage by staff. The footage was shown frequently on Brazilian news shows for days after the fire.

Aftermath 
Although no one died as a result of the fire (which was ultimately attributed to an electrical short circuit), many were treated for minor smoke inhalation, and four individuals were seriously injured by smoke inhalation and burns. These included Leonilson (nicknamed "Léo"), Xuxa's personal bodyguard; the show's resident clown Topetão; and two of the children. The two men helped save many of the children (including one who had become stuck in one of the on-set rides). All eventually recovered from their injuries after a long health treatment, funded by the network.

Xuxa, who was not injured, nevertheless was strongly affected by the fire, and reportedly spent quite some time afterwards in a deep post-traumatic stress disorder. She visited the fire victims and their families in the hospital frequently. Xuxa Park went on hiatus after the fire, and was ultimately cancelled. The time slot previously occupied by Xuxa Park in the saturday morning was replaced with cartoons and TV series. Eight episodes had been taped and never aired, out of respect for the victims, according to the network. Xuxa returned to the studios where the show was taped three months after the fire, in April, to record the penultimate season of the TV show Planeta Xuxa.

References

External links
Various news articles (in Portuguese) archived by the Internet Archive Wayback Machine
"Xuxa em Chamas" on YouTube.com

2001 in Brazil
2001 fires in  South America
Fires in Brazil
Television in Brazil